Randall C. Stufflebeam (born May 27, 1960) is an American political activist and former national vice-chairman of the Constitution Party.

Political career
Stufflebeam was a write-in candidate in the 2006 Illinois gubernatorial election against Democratic incumbent Rod Blagojevich, Republican Judy Baar Topinka, and Green Rich Whitney.  His running mate was Randy White. He is also state chairman of Illinois' Constitution Party and is a former Marine. Stufflebeam received 19,020 votes (0.55%) in his write-in bid for the Governor's office.

In June 2007 Stufflebeam announced that he was running for Illinois State Representative in the 114th District.  Despite Stufflebeam's announcement he did not run in the 2008 election.

He filed as a candidate for U.S. Senator from Illinois in 2010, but the Illinois State Board of Elections disqualified the slate of Constitution Party candidates.

At the 2012 Constitution Party National Convention, Stufflebeam was elected the National Vice-Chairman of the Constitution Party. He originally ran for chairman, but was defeated by Frank Fluckiger.

In January 2013, Stufflebeam announced the formation of an exploratory committee for a possible U.S. Senate run in Illinois in 2014. However, on March 2, he announced that after long deliberation he would not run for the U.S. Senate after all. Stufflebeam later announced he would run for Governor of Illinois in the 2018 election.

He resides in Belleville, Illinois.

References

External links

Stufflebeam for U.S. Senate 2014 Exploratory Committee
Constitution Party of Illinois

1960 births
Living people
United States Marines
Illinois Constitutionalists
People from Belleville, Illinois
Conservatism in the United States